The Battle of Saint-Louis-du-Sud, also known as the Battle of Port Louis, was a battle fought in the Austrian War of Succession on 22 March 1748 in the French Caribbean colony of Saint Domingue (now the Republic of Haiti). A British squadron under the command of Admiral Charles Knowles attacked and destroyed a large French fort under command of French governor Étienne Cochard de Chastenoye.

Battle

Background

Britain had been attacking the Spanish colonies in the War of Jenkins' Ear since 1739 but with only limited success. The War of Austrian Succession had spread to the Caribbean and French colonies soon became a target also and islands such as Guadeloupe, Martinique and Saint Domingue were under a close blockade by the Royal Navy. After Knowles finished his stint as governor of Louisbourg he was promoted to rear-admiral of the white on 15 July 1747, and appointed as commander in chief on the Jamaica station.

Knowles had initially intended to take his squadron and attack the Spanish at Santiago de Cuba, but contrary winds led to him deciding instead to attack the French Fort Saint Louis de Sud at Saint Domingue. Shortly before midday on 22 March 1748 in HMS Elizabeth Knowles's led his squadron into the harbor of Port Saint Louis, completely surprising its defenders. An imposing seventy eight gun island castle guarded the road stead, manned by 310 troops and a company of black gunners under Governor Étienne Cochard de Chastenoye behind a twenty four foot-high stone walls.

Action
The first French guns opened fire at 12:05 pm but Knowles's ships remained silent until all of them had anchored beneath the ramparts. As soon as this strategy was coming to form Knowles ordered his ships to open fire in a volley of broadsides at point blank range. A heated exchange ensued for the next three hours; the British ships pounding the French fort. The desperate defenders sent a fire-ship down from the inner roads, which compelled Elizabeth to cut her cable and warp out of danger.

The remaining Royal Navy ships however maintained a fierce pressure, so much so that the fort was starting to crumble and French counter fire was becoming slacker. Many guns and gun crews had been knocked out by British cannon fire and French casualties were heavy. Seeing the destruction that lay before him and British cannon fire not letting up, Chastenoye had no choice but to send out an officer out at 3:00 pm to suggest terms. Knowles made a counteroffer, and half an hour later the French commander accepted. The terms for the French were to surrender and that the fort would be occupied by the British without molestation.

Aftermath
The garrison had suffered 160 casualties in all, compared to nineteen killed and fifty wounded among the British warships. The French garrison under the terms surrendered, but were soon released and marched away to the safety of the nearest settlement but keeping their firearms and not to fight against any of the British forces for a year and a day.

British sailors and marines then occupied the fort and set about dismantling it. The British also seized four ships. Over the course of the week the castle was set for demolition and destroyed. Knowles stood away on 30 March and knowing with victory complete, then headed off again hoping to assault Santiago de Cuba. This time however he was repelled by the Spanish.

Ships involved

Citations

References

 
 
 

Battle of Saint-Louis-du-Sud
Naval battles of the War of the Austrian Succession
18th century in Haiti
Military history of the Caribbean
Naval battles involving Great Britain
Naval battles involving France
1748 in the Caribbean
1748 in the British Empire